F. polymorpha may refer to:

 Ficus polymorpha, a plant with edible fruit
 Fomitiporia polymorpha, a fungus bearing spores on basidia